Chandpur-6 is a defunct constituency represented in the Jatiya Sangsad (National Parliament) of Bangladesh abolished in 2006.

Members of Parliament

References

External links 

 

Former parliamentary constituencies of Bangladesh
Chandpur District